Jeff Brown (born April 24, 1978) is a Canadian former professional ice hockey defenceman.  He was drafted in the first round, twenty-second overall, of the 1996 NHL Entry Draft by the New York Rangers, but never played a game in the NHL.

Career statistics

External links

1978 births
Canadian ice hockey defencemen
Cardiff Devils players
Charlotte Checkers (1993–2010) players
Hartford Wolf Pack players
Ice hockey people from Ontario
Kalamazoo Wings (UHL) players
London Knights players
Living people
Missouri River Otters players
National Hockey League first-round draft picks
New Haven Knights players
New York Rangers draft picks
Port Huron Flags players
San Antonio Rampage players
Sarnia Sting players
Sheffield Steelers players
Sportspeople from Mississauga
Texas Wildcatters players
Canadian expatriate ice hockey players in England
Canadian expatriate ice hockey players in Wales